Antonucci is an Italian surname. Notable people with the surname include:

 Danny Antonucci (born 1957), Canadian animator, director, producer, and writer
 Dominic Antonucci American ballet master and ex-principal dancer with the Birmingham Royal Ballet 
 Francesco Antonucci, Belgian-Italian footballer
 Giorgio Antonucci (born 1933), Italian physician, known for his questioning of the basis of psychiatry
 Mirko Antonucci, Italian footballer
 Toni Antonucci, American psychologist

See also

Antenucci

Italian-language surnames
Patronymic surnames
Surnames from given names